Major-General Gerald Ion Gartlan   (24 June 1889 – 15 July 1975) was a senior British Army officer who served in the First World War and the Second World War.

Military career
Born in County Down in what is now Northern Ireland, in June 1889, Gartlan was educated at Downside School and the Royal Military College, Sandhurst, from where he was commissioned into the Royal Irish Rifles (later the Royal Ulster Rifles) in 1909. He was promoted to lieutenant in November 1910.

He saw service during the First World War, mainly as a staff officer on the Western Front, and, after being awarded with the Military Cross (MC), he was later appointed a Companion of the Distinguished Service Order for his service during the Upper Silesia plebiscite. He was promoted to captain in September 1915.

After attending Staff College, Camberley from 1924 to 1925, he became commander of the regimental depot of the Royal Ulster Rifles in 1929. He went on to be commanding officer of the 2nd Battalion of the Royal Ulster Rifles from 1933 to 1936 and attended the Imperial Defence College in 1937. Towards the end of the interwar period, he was made the commander of the 5th Infantry Brigade in 1938, which was accompanied by the rank of brigadier.

He was deployed to France with his brigade, which formed part of the 2nd Infantry Division in the British Expeditionary Force (BEF), at the start of the Second World War. Following the Dunkirk evacuation, the 2nd Division was placed on Home Defence duties in Yorkshire. He briefly served as acting General Officer Commanding (GOC) of the 2nd Division from 15 August 1940 to 18 September 1940. In late February 1941 he was promoted to the acting rank of major-general and assumed command of the Dorset County Division, which he commanded until December 1941 when it was disbanded. He then served as the district commander for the East Riding of Yorkshire before retiring with the honorary rank of major-general in 1944.

He returned to Northern Ireland with his two daughters and, always keen on sports, served as a deputy lieutenant for his native County Down in 1952. In 1954 he was High Sheriff of Down and the following year was made a justice of the peace.

References

Bibliography

External links
Generals of World War II

1889 births
1975 deaths
Northern Ireland justices of the peace
High Sheriffs of Down
Deputy Lieutenants of Down
Military personnel from County Down
Graduates of the Royal College of Defence Studies
British Army major generals
Royal Ulster Rifles officers
Commanders of the Order of the British Empire
Companions of the Distinguished Service Order
Recipients of the Military Cross
Graduates of the Royal Military College, Sandhurst
British Army personnel of World War I
British Army generals of World War II
Graduates of the Staff College, Camberley
People educated at Downside School